The 2021 Cork Premier Senior Hurling Championship was the second staging of the Cork Premier Senior Hurling Championship and the 133rd staging overall of a championship for the top-ranking hurling teams in Cork. The draw for the group stage placings took place on 29 April 2021. The championship began on 14 July 2021 and ended on 21 November 2021.

Blackrock entered the championship as the defending champions, however, they were beaten by Midleton at the semi-final stage.  Carrigtwohill were relegated from the championship after being beaten in a playoff by Charleville.  

The final was played on 21 November 2021 at Páirc Uí Chaoimh in Cork, between Glen Rovers and Midleton, in what was their first meeting in a final in 30 years. Midleton won the match by 0-24 to 1-18 to claim their eighth championship title overall and a first title since 2013.  

Patrick Horgan was the championship's top scorer with 6-56.

Team changes

To Championship

Promoted from the Cork Senior A Hurling Championship
 Charleville

From Championship

Relegated to the Cork Senior A Hurling Championship
 Ballyhea

Participating teams

Clubs

The seedings were based on final group stage positions from the 2020 championship.

Divisions and colleges

Group stage

Group A

Table

Results

Group B

Table

Results

Group C

Table

Results

Divisional/colleges sections

Round 1

Round 2

Final

Relegation playoff

Playoff

Knockout stage

Bracket

Quarter-finals

Semi-finals

Final

Championship statistics

Top scorers

Overall

In a single game

Miscellaneous
 Seandún return to the championship for the first time since the 2010 Championship

 Seandún recorded their first championship victory over Muskerry in 62 years. It was also the divisional sides first championship win since 2003.
 Midleton win the title for the first time since 2013.
 Glen Rovers become the first team since Cloyne in 2006 to lose three finals in a row.

References

External link

 Cork GAA website

Cork Senior Hurling Championship
Cork
Cork Premier Senior Hurling Championship